Silvia Salemi (born 2 April 1978) is an Italian singer-songwriter and television personality.

Life and career 
Born in Palazzolo Acreide, Syracuse, in 1995 Salemi won the Castrocaro Music Festival with the song "Con questo sentimento".

In 1996 she entered the competition at the Sanremo Music Festival with the song "Quando il cuore", ranking at fifth place in the "Newcomers" section. A year later she returned to Sanremo Festival, this time entering the "Big Artists" section, with the song "A casa di Luca", ranking fourth and obtaining both a critical and commercial success. She entered into the Sanremo Festival two more times, in 1998 with the song "Pathos" and in 2003 with "Il cuore delle donne".

In 1998 Salemi co-hosted, alongside Pippo Baudo, the Canale 5 variety show Il gran ballo delle debuttanti.  In 1999, she hosted the Rai 3 religious themed program Viaggi nei luoghi del sacro.  In 2004 she took part to the Rai 2 reality show Music Farm.  In 2009 Silvia takes a break from show business and works at Tezenis, an underwear shop in Rome. In 2013, she was cast in Tale e Quale Show, the Italian version of the Your Face Sounds Familiar franchise.

Discography

Album 
   1996 - Silvia Salemi
    1997 - Caotica
    1998 - Pathos
    2000 - L'arancia
    2003 - Gioco del Duende
    2007 - Il mutevole abitante del mio solito involucro
    2017 - 23

Selected singles
     1996 - "Nessuno mi può giudicare"
     1996 - "Quando il cuore"
     1997 - "A casa di Luca"
     1997 - "Stai con me stanotte"
     1998 - "Pathos"
     1998 - "Odiami perché"
     2000 - "La parola amore"
     2000 - "E ci batteva il sole" 
     2002 - "J'adore"
     2003 - "Nel cuore delle donne"
     2003 - "Dimenticami"
     2007 - "Il mutevole abitante del mio solito involucro"
     2009 - "Commessa Commossa"
     2012 - "Amore disperato"
     2017 - "Potrebbe Essere"

References

External links 

 Silvia Salemi at Discogs

1978 births
Living people
People from Palazzolo Acreide
Italian singer-songwriters
Italian pop singers
Italian television personalities
21st-century Italian singers
21st-century Italian women singers